The incertohypothalamic pathway is a short dopaminergic pathway from the zona incerta to the hypothalamus of the brain. It has a role in modulation of fear and the integration of autonomic and neuroendocrine responses to specific sensory stimuli for example during sexual behaviour.

See also 
Dopaminergic cell groups

References 

Central nervous system pathways